Mal Amiri may refer to:
 Mal Amiri-ye Hajj Saadat Karam
 Mal Amiri-ye Olya
 Mal Amiri-ye Sofla